Windham Mountain is a ski resort located in the town of Windham, New York (US), in the northern section of the Catskill Mountains, approximately 2.5 hours north of New York City. It has 54 trails and 12 lifts, including four high-speed detachable lifts. One being a  express 6 Pack and three high speed detachable quads . The resort has 6 terrain parks that are great for all skill levels of park skiing.

History
The New York state assembly considered opening a state-run ski resort on Windham (then called Cave Mountain) in the late 1950s. That project never advanced, but instead, a group of private investors bought the land and opened Cave Mountain Ski Area in 1960. Three years later, ownership was transferred to Bob, James and Tom Sheridan, who opened a ski lodge on the property and introduced snowmaking that initially covered 12 acres.

In 1981, Irv Naylor, the owner and founder of Snow Time, Inc., purchased the ski area and renamed it Ski Windham. It was Naylor's third resort, as he already owned Ski Roundtop and Ski Liberty.

In 1987, several new trails were constructed, as well as the new "G" lift, serving Windham's second summit, the East Peak.

1993 saw the installation of the mountain's first ever high-speed quad chairlift, serving the mountain's west peak, as by that time the mountain contained over 30 trails on two peaks, along with real estate developments and a modern lodge.

In 1997, lights were installed on several lower mountain trails as Windham became the only mountain in the Catskills to feature night skiing.

The 2006–2007 ski season featured $5 million in off-season investments, as three new trails were cut, one from the top of East Peak and two smaller ones among the trails that exist already. These new trails were named Wedgie, Whiskey Jack and Wapeka. Wedgie was later renamed to World Cup. These new trails have created a new entry way to get from the west side to the bottom of the East Peak Express Quad. The old G-lift triple moved across the mountain to replace the Wonderama Triple, and another carpet was added to the beginner area.

Windham also underwent major renovations prior to the 2013/14 ski season. The former learn to ski area was expanded and relocated to what used to be the parking lot, and was renamed Whisper Run. Parking was moved to the north and across the street from the lower parking lot, below Whisper Run. Two new trails were added at this time, one being a glade trail called Whataride Glades, and another being a trail called Windfall. Since then, two new trails have been added: Wolf's Prey prior to the 2014/15 ski season, and Wildcat prior to the 2015/16 ski season.

Skiing the mountain
Windham features 54 trails on 285 skiable acres. The trails are situated on two separate mountain peaks, known as East Peak and West Peak. Of the trails 13 are designated beginner, 24 intermediate, and 17 expert skill level. The mountain also features six terrain parks and night skiing on select, lower mountain runs. 
98% of trails are covered by snowmaking.

Windham Mountain is also home of the Adaptive Sports Foundation which provides the physical and intellectually disabled with lessons on how to ski, snowboard, bike ride, and a various amount of other types of sports.

Competition from Belleayre Mountain
In 2008, two New York state senators supported a bill that would establish a $150,000 blue-ribbon panel to look at the competition state-run recreational facilities posed to privately owned operations. David Donaldson, the Ulster County Legislature chairman, saw the bill as a direct attack on nearby state-owned Belleayre Ski Center in Ulster County, and connected the operators of Windham and Hunter Mountains to the effort to "cripple" Belleayre. The operators of the two privately run mountains had previously complained that as a mountain partially funded by taxpayers, Belleayre was taking business away from Windham and Hunter because it did not have to worry about making a profit.

The bill passed in both the state Senate and Assembly, but was vetoed by Governor David Patterson in September 2008.

References

External links
Official site
Interactive trail map
3dSkiMap of Windham Mountain Ski Resort
Official Site of the Adaptive Sports Foundation which operates out of Windham Mountain
History of Windham Mountain

Ski areas and resorts in New York (state)
Sports venues in Greene County, New York
1960 establishments in New York (state)